Atención Atención (English: Listen Up Listen Up) is a Puerto Rican live action/puppet children's television show and band formed in San Juan, Puerto Rico, in 1999 starring three costumed characters and their friends, the Atención Atención band. Atención Atención explores a specific theme in each episode, e.g. "Colors", "Friends" and "Means of transportation" through songs and short storylines in the half-hour program. Additionally, the show teaches children life and social skills, such as sharing and travels around the world with Vera, the traveling flea. It also encourages viewers to move along with and dance with the characters in the program. It all started in 1999 giving music workshops to kindergarten teachers in Puerto Rico and Dominican Republic and with Víctor Rivera's vision of a live action TV show that was a cross between Sesame Street and MTV, the band filmed their first DVD in 2006.

Members 

Atención Atención band
 Víctor M. Rivera – Voice and musical director (1999-present)
 Stephanie Mercado "Clara" – Voice and transverse flute (2010–present)
 Nelson Camacho – Bass (2005–present)
 Denes Pagan – Guitar (2021–present)
 Luis Seguinot – Drums (2013-present)
 Janice Maisonet - Sax (2014-present)
 Meliana González – Piano (2019–present)

Former members
 Rafael Gonzalez - drums 2005-2012 (in end credits until 2016)
 Joel Martinez - guitar 2005-2020 (in end credits until 2019)
 Juan Manuel Rivera Vázquez - Piano (2005–2019, removed in wake of arrest and conviction for criminal child sexual exploitation)

Characters
 Mr. Frog
 Johnny the Lizard
 Angel Tito
 Vera the traveling flea
 Cillo the elf
 Fairy Tapita
 Makako Monkey

Recognitions 
Atención Atención had 52 nominations to the Emmy Award Suncoast Chapter and is winner of twenty seven statuettes in different categories:
 Best Audio in 2011
 Best Educational Program in 2012
 Best Children Program, Best Post Production Director and Best Audio in 2013
 Best Animation, Best Music and On-Camera Talent in 2014
 Best Audio and Best Live Director in 2015
 Best Educational Program, Best Animation, Best Post Production Director, Best Script, Best Graphics, Best Art director and Best Technical Achievement in 2016 
 Best Animation, Best Post Production Director, Best Graphics and Best Technical Achievement in 2017
 Best Children Program, Best Animation, Best Editor and Best writer in 2018
 Best Commercial (Single Spot) and Best Graphics Arts in 2022

On November 21, 2013, the band was nominated for a Latin Grammy award for Best Children's Album with Vamos a bailar.

On January 25, 2012, the show was recognized as a "Program for Lifelong Learning" by the United Nations in their Music as a Global Resource Compendium - Third Edition in 2012

Discography

CDs 
  1999: Atención Atención este juego va a empezar 
  2001: Atención Atención este juego va a seguir 
  2004: Atención Atención llega la navidad 
  2006: Atención Atención en vivo 
  2008: Atención Atención el especial 
  2009: Atención Atención vamos a dormir 
  2010: De viaje con el Sr. Sapo y Vera - Live 
  2011: ¿Que pasa con la música? 
  2012: Vamos a bailar 
  2014: Atención Atención Live (Anniversary tour) 
  2015: Atención Atención Symphonic 
  2016: ¿Donde está el Sr. Sapo? CD/DVD
  2018: Bam Bim Bum SINGLE
  2019: La Le Li Lo Lu SINGLE
  2020: El Ukulele SINGLE
  2021: Vuelvo a la escuela SINGLE
  2021: La mascarilla SINGLE
  2021: Feliz, Feliz Navidad SINGLE
  2022: Yupi Yei SINGLE

DVDs 
  2006: Atención Atención en vivo 
  2007: Atención Atención el especial 
  2009: Atención Atención el especial 2 
  2010: Atención Atención de viaje con el Sr. Sapo y Vera - Live 
  2011: ¿Que pasa con la música? The concert 
  2012: Atención Atención "First Season" 
  2013: Atención Atención "Second season" 
  2014: Atención Atención 15 años "The anniversary concert"
  2015: Atención Atención ¡Vamos a cantar! Sing Along Vol.1
  2015: Atención Atención "Third season" 
  2016: ¿Donde está el Sr. Sapo? CD/DVD
  2017: Atención Atención "Fourth season"
  2018: ¿Donde está el Sr. Sapo? 360˚ Live - Online exclusive
  2019: Atención Atención es navidad - Online exclusive

Seasons overview

Countries aired 
 United States in Univision
 Dominican Republic in Antena Latina 7
 Puerto Rico in Telemundo Puerto Rico

References

External links 
 Atención Atención official website

Musical groups established in 1999
1999 establishments in Puerto Rico